Nivedita Kulkarni (born March 5, 1987) is an American actress, model, writer, and comedian. She performs regularly at the Upright Citizens Brigade Theater, and is best known as the national face of Bank of America. She is a part of the ensemble cast of "The Untitled Web Series That Morgan Evans Is Doing", which was nominated for a Writers Guild Award in 2013.

Career
Nivedita Kulkarni was a finalist of Miss India America in 2007. After earning a degree in Econometrics from Washington University in St. Louis, she moved to New York and began her acting career.

Kulkarni has performed in stage shows including: Anish Shah's National Summer of Comedy Tour, "The Laziest Woman In The World," which gained a mention in The New York Times, and the 2011 national NetIP Summit, where Kulkarni became the first Indian American to perform an improvised show on national television.

In 2011, she was selected to be one of the national spokeswomen for Bank of America, and the only South Asian face of the brand. She was subsequently cast in a principal role in Tochi Onyebuchi's film Lippizaners, which released in 2013. She also did a television commercial for Nescafe USA for 2013.

Nivedita's 2012 article for the Huffington Post, titled "The Craft of Acting," ran on the HuffPost Front Page and on HuffPost Beauty in 2012.

Non-profit work

Kulkarni has partnered with the Nanubhai to organize combined theater shows and fundraisers. The Nanubhai Education Foundation is a US-based non-profit organization that works to promote childhood education in India. In 2012, Kulkarni was nominated to the national Lady Godiva Program for her work with the Nanubhai Foundation.

Filmography

Awards and nominations

References

External links

https://www.deadline.com/2013/01/wga-announces-new-media-videogame-nominees/
https://web.archive.org/web/20150901174238/http://www.wga.org/wga-awards/nominees-winners.aspx
https://www.huffingtonpost.com/wyatt-closs/new-media-writers-guild-awards-nominees_b_2642875.html#slide=2076905
Official website
http://www.ucbcomedy.com/talent/view/1616/nivedita-kulkarni
http://ladygodivaprogram.com/nominees/entry/5511
http://www.desiclub.com/bollywood/bollywood_features/bolly_article.cfm?id=3410
https://www.huffingtonpost.com/nivedita-kulkarni/body-image_b_2025304.html
http://www.buzzinebollywood.com/interviews/lifestyle-interview-nivedita-kulkarni-lippizaners-03022012
http://theater.nytimes.com/show/58520/The-Laziest-Woman-in-the-World/overview
http://niveditakulkarni.squarespace.com/about/

1987 births
Living people
American actresses of Indian descent
American film actresses
21st-century American women
Washington University in St. Louis alumni